Manjhariya  is a village development committee in Nawalparasi District in the Lumbini Zone of southern Nepal. At the time of the 1991 Nepal census, Manjhariya had a population of 2,977 people living in 427 individual households.

References

Populated places in Parasi District